Utricularia involvens is a medium-sized, probably perennial, carnivorous plant that belongs to the genus Utricularia. It grows naturally in southeastern Asia (Burma, Peninsular Malaysia, Thailand) and northern Australia. It was originally described and published by Henry Nicholas Ridley in 1895.

See also 
 List of Utricularia species

References

External links 

Carnivorous plants of Asia
Carnivorous plants of Australia
Flora of Myanmar
Flora of Peninsular Malaysia
Flora of Thailand
Flora of the Northern Territory
involvens
Lamiales of Australia